Ferzikovsky District is an administrative and municipal district (raion), one of the twenty-four in Kaluga Oblast, Russia. It is located in the east of the oblast. Its administrative center is the urban locality (a settlement) of Ferzikovo. As of the 2021 Census, the total population of the district was 17,557, with the population of Ferzikovo accounting for 25.5% of that number.

Administrative and municipal status
Administratively, the district is not divided into smaller units and has direct jurisdiction over one settlement of urban type (Ferzikovo) and 155 rural localities. Municipally, the territory of the district is incorporated as Ferzikovsky Municipal District, with the exception of the selo of Novozhdamirovo, which is municipally a part of Kaluga Urban Okrug.

References

Notes

Sources

Districts of Kaluga Oblast
